Aithbhreac Inghean Coirceadal was a medieval Scottish poet.

Biography
In 1470, she wrote an elegy to her husband, Niall Og Mac Neill, Constable of Castle Sween, Knapdale, which was the earliest documented poem in Classic Scottish Gaelic, written by a woman. It was written in the Classic Bardic meter and is one of only four existing poems written in this style by a woman.

References

15th-century Scottish people
Scottish women poets
Scottish Gaelic women poets
Scottish Gaelic poets
15th-century Scottish poets
Scottish Renaissance writers